Kyaikmaraw is a town in the Mon State of south-east Myanmar,  southeast of Mawlamyine.

Etymology
"Kyaikmaraw" derives from the Mon language term "Kyaikparo", which means "prominent Buddha."

Attractions 
Kyaikmaraw Paya, a huge Buddha image sitting in the "westerner manner" is a major tourist site in town. It was built in AD 1455 by Queen Shin Saw Pu, the only female ruler in the history of Myanmar.
Tun Tun Min, lethwei former World Champion is a local star of village.
Tun Tun Min is the youngest world champion in lethwei history, 21 old.

References 

Township capitals of Myanmar
Populated places in Mon State
Old Cities of Mon people